Agh Kand (also Romanized as Āgh Kand; also known as Āqkand and Āq Kand) is a village in Quri Chay-ye Sharqi Rural District, in the Central District of Charuymaq County, East Azerbaijan Province, Iran. At the 2006 census, its population was 85, in 19 families.

References 

Populated places in Charuymaq County